Zénith d'Orléans is an indoor sporting arena and concert hall that is located in the city of Orléans, France.  The arena, one of a series of similar venues throughout France, has a seating capacity of 5,338 for basketball games and 6,900 for concerts.

History
While the arena has mainly been used for concerts, it has also served as the home arena of the French Pro A League professional basketball team Entente Orléanaise, for European cup matches like EuroLeague and EuroCup games.

External links
 Zénith d'Orléans Website 
 Virtual Tour 

Indoor arenas in France
Basketball venues in France
Buildings and structures in Orléans
Sports venues in Loiret
Sports venues completed in 1996